Jassim Youssef Al Tamimi  is a Qatari former football midfielder who played for the Qatar national football team in the 2000 Asian Cup. He also played for Al Wakrah and Al Sadd. He has 100 caps for the national team.

References

External links

1971 births
Living people
Qatari footballers
Al Sadd SC players
Al-Wakrah SC players
Qatar Stars League players
Association football midfielders
Qatar international footballers
Footballers at the 1998 Asian Games
Asian Games competitors for Qatar
2000 AFC Asian Cup players
2004 AFC Asian Cup players